The Corruption Investigation Office for High-ranking Officials, or CIO in short, is an independent agency of the South Korean government responsible for prosecuting crimes and investigating allegations involving "high-ranking officials" or their direct family members. 

The CIO is expected to police almost 6,500 "high-ranking officials" - incumbent and former - and their spouses and children. The Act specifies the posts as high-ranking government officials, parliamentarians, prosecutors, judges and the President. However, its investigative authority limits to cases related to certain crimes defined by the Act leaving other sorts of allegations and crimes - sexual harassment case for instance - to the Supreme Prosecutors' Office for investigation and prosecution.

History
The Act on establishment and operation of CIO was passed by the parliament in December 2019 and taken into force in July 2020. However, due to the then opposition party's refusal to cooperate by not nominating their own share of members of the CIO head nomination committee, it had not initiated operations by its legally mandated date of 1 July 2020. 

In February 2020 the Constitutional Court of Korea agreed to hear the case filed by the opposition party against its establishment. After breaking the law to announce its ruling in less than 180 days from the day it agreed to hear the case, the Court found the CIO's establishment law constitutional in January 2021.

In December 2020, the CIO head nomination committee recommended two candidates to the President Moon - both initially recommended by the President of Bar Association. On January 21, 2021, Kim Jin-wook, a former judge and Kim & Chang lawyer, was appointed as the first head of the CIO.

On March 4, 2021, Prosecutor General Yoon Suk-yeol offered to resign over objections on the CIO's creation as some of their powers would be taken from the Supreme Prosecutor's Office.

By May, 2021, the office finished the appointment of 13 prosecutors and 18 investigators, of the possible maximum of 23 and 40 respectively.

Organization
The head of CIO is appointed by the President among two candidates recommended by the nomination committee. The committee is composed of Minister of Justice, Minister of National Court Administration, President of Korean Bar Association and four members - two recommended by the ruling party and the other by the opposition. As any of the final two candidates must be agreed by all six committee members, its two members recommended by the opposition party - and the opposition party broadly - are considered to have a veto power over the selection of CIO chief. After the first nomination committee entered gridlock as two members recommended by the opposition party exercised their veto power for all candidates recommended by other five members, the ruling party successfully pushed a legislative amendment to change the condition. The amended Act now requires the nomination committee to form only 5 of the 7 total possible votes - effectively removing veto power of the opposition party - to choose the final two candidates.

The law allows for a maximum of 25 prosecutors, including the office head and deputy.

See also 
 Supreme Prosecutors' Office of the Republic of Korea
 Anti-Corruption and Civil Rights Commission
 Board of Audit and Inspection

References 

Gwacheon
Anti-corruption agencies
Independent government agencies of South Korea